Wendie Jo Sperber (September 15, 1958 – November 29, 2005) was an American actress, known for her performances in the films I Wanna Hold Your Hand (1978), Bachelor Party (1984), and Back to the Future (1985), as well as the television sitcoms Bosom Buddies (1980–1982) and Private Benjamin (1982–1983).

Early life
Sperber was born in Hollywood, California, to Burton Seymour Sperber and Charlene Marie ( Hirshon) Sperber, and had three siblings (Ellice, Michelle and Richard).

Career
Sperber began her screen career at a young age when she was cast in the small role of "Kuchinsky", in Matthew Robbins' 1978 teen comedy Corvette Summer, alongside Mark Hamill and Annie Potts. She appeared in Robert Zemeckis' period comedy I Wanna Hold Your Hand, as Rosie Petrofsky. Sperber was able to move quickly on screen (Entertainment Weekly described Rosie Petrofsky as "a screaming Beatlemaniac who, among other things, climbed through elevator shafts").  

She played the title role in the ABC Afterschool Special feature Dinky Hocker, which dealt with a teenager's attempts to hide her feelings by eating, and engaged in physical comedy in Steven Spielberg's 1941.  Zemeckis, who also worked on 1941, brought Sperber back to the big screen in 1980 with a role in his comedy Used Cars, but it was on television that year that Sperber began to receive more serious attention.

She was cast in the role of "Amy Cassidy" — a character that was funny, romantic, and exuberant — in the series Bosom Buddies starring Tom Hanks and Peter Scolari. Following its cancellation in 1982, Sperber worked a year on the series Private Benjamin. She then resumed her feature work in the Tom Hanks theatrical vehicle Bachelor Party, directed by Neal Israel. Israel did cast her again in Moving Violations in 1985. That same year, she appeared as Linda McFly in Zemeckis' highly successful Back to the Future. She reprised her role as Linda in Back to the Future Part III.

Sperber's roles grew larger in the wake of Back to the Future, and over the next decade she starred in the series Babes (a comedy about three overweight sisters) but the series was cancelled after one season. In 1994, Sperber was cast in a major supporting part in the CBS television series Hearts Afire. In 1998 she guest starred as April, the cleaning lady and Grace's muse, on the twelfth episode of Will & Grace. Her last work was voicing a character on the animated TV series American Dad (episode titled "Roger 'n' Me") that aired in 2006, after her death.

Advocacy
In addition to her work on TV and movies, Sperber also was the founder of  Cancer Support Center, an independent organization formed in 2001 to advance and help support individuals and their families fighting various forms of cancer through free emotional support, information and social events/activities.  In addition to being the founder, Sperber also served on the board of directors and wrote the quarterly newsletter. According to one of the last known interviews with Sperber by Terra Wellington, the  organization was her key cause and effort in the last year of her life with her stating "The whole idea of  programming was that I didn't want people to walk into a room and have a therapist ask how they feel.  I wanted peer support."

Personal life
In 1997, Sperber was diagnosed with breast cancer, which seemed to go into remission following treatment. She revealed in April 2002 that the cancer had metastasized throughout her body, and by mid-2004 she had undergone experimental brain radiation therapy. She continued to work in television and movies during this period, including episodes of Unhappily Ever After, Home Improvement, Will & Grace, Grounded for Life, and the movies Desperate but Not Serious (1999) and Sorority Boys (2002).

She died on November 29, 2005, aged 47, in Los Angeles.

Filmography

References

External links
 
 "One Fun Babe", a 1990 Entertainment Weekly profile of Sperber that discusses her role on the sitcom Babes.
 The Show Must Go On documentary about Wendie Jo Sperber
 

1958 births
2005 deaths
Actresses from Hollywood, Los Angeles
American film actresses
Jewish American actresses
American humanitarians
Women humanitarians
American Jews
American television actresses
Deaths from breast cancer
Deaths from cancer in California
Activists from California
Burials at Mount Sinai Memorial Park Cemetery
20th-century American actresses
21st-century American women